Several ships of the Royal Norwegian Navy have borne the name HNoMS Storm:

  was a  launched in 1898 and wrecked by grounding in 1940.
  was a  fast patrol boat completed on 31 May 1963
  was a  fast patrol boat launched on 6 October 1967 and completed on 28 November 1967.
  is a  launched on 1 November 2006.

References

Royal Norwegian Navy ship names